Anikeyev (feminine: Anikeyeva) is a Russian language surname derived from the Russian colloquial form Anikey (Аникей) for the Greek-language given name Ioannikiy (Иоанникий, Ἰωαννίκιος, Ioannikios). Notable people with the surname include:

Andrey Anikeyev (born 1961), Russian politician
Ivan Anikeyev (1933–1992), Soviet cosmonaut
Grigory Anikeyev (born 1972), Russian politician
Ekaterina Anikeeva (born 1969), Russian Olympic water polo player

Russian-language surnames